American Airlines Flight 1 was a regularly scheduled passenger flight from New York International (Idlewild) Airport (now John F. Kennedy International Airport) to Los Angeles International Airport. During the March 1, 1962 operation of the flight, the Boeing 707 executing it  rolled over and crashed into Jamaica Bay two minutes after takeoff, killing all 87 passengers and eight crew members aboard. A Civil Aeronautics Board  investigation determined that a manufacturing defect in the autopilot system led to an uncommanded rudder control system input, causing the accident. A number of notable people died in the crash. It was the fifth fatal Boeing 707 accident, and at the time, the deadliest. It was third of three fatal crashes during an operation of American Airlines Flight 1.

Flight and crash 
The aircraft was a Boeing 707-123B, registered as N7506A. It was the 12th Boeing 707 constructed and was delivered to American Airlines on February 12, 1959. At the time of the crash, it had accumulated 8,147 flight hours. Its last periodic inspection had occurred on January 18, 1962, at 7,922 hours. The flight crew consisted of Captain James Heist (56), First Officer Michael Barna Jr. (35), Second Officer Robert Pecor (32), and Flight Engineer Robert Cain (32).

The aircraft received instructions to taxi to Runway 31L at 09:54 EST, and clearance to proceed to Los Angeles nonstop under instrument flight rules (IFR) at 10:02. The aircraft became airborne at 10:07. Following American Airlines procedures and departure control instructions, the aircraft initiated a left turn to a heading of 290°.

The Boeing 707 crashed into Pumpkin Patch Channel, Jamaica Bay, at 10:08:49, while angled at 78° and on a magnetic heading of 300°. Passengers aboard a Mohawk Airlines plane bound for Albany that took off immediately after the Boeing watched the plane plunge into the bay. The jet exploded upon impact, a tall splash of brackish water and black smoke erupted from the site, and the scattered debris and fuel caught fire. Long Island residents described hearing explosions that shook the foundations of nearby houses, although no one on the ground is known to have witnessed the airliner hitting the swamp. However, a few men at Naval Air Station New York/Floyd Bennett Field saw the massive column of water rising above the hangars, and one guard—at his post on the Cross Bay Bridge—saw the aircraft roll over.

The aircraft crashed into a remote area of marshland on Jamaica Bay used as a wildlife sanctuary. Upwards of 300 policemen and fire fighters, including 125 detectives attending a narcotics seminar at the police academy, as well as Coast Guard helicopters, were mobilized to the crash site within 30 minutes of the crash for rescue operations, only to find no survivors. The three-alarm fire was under control by 10:50, when only wreckage remained. Low tides aided search personnel in their attempts to recover bodies from the downed aircraft. Only a few bodies remained intact.

Federal investigation
The Civil Aeronautics Board (CAB) received notification of the accident at 10:10 am and immediately sent investigators to Jamaica Bay to conduct an investigation. The flight recorder was found on March 9 and sent to Washington, DC, for analysis. Public hearings were held at the International Hotel in New York on March 20–23, 1962.

Investigators were unable to recover sufficient body tissue to determine whether the crew had been physically incapacitated at the time of the crash. Toxicology reports conclusively ruled out toxic gases, alcohol, and drugs as possible causes for the crash. Milton Helpern, Chief Medical Examiner, decided that having relatives attempt visual identification of the crash victims was inhumane and ordered dental and fingerprint comparisons. In early July, the CAB announced their investigators believed that a cotter pin and a bolt missing from the rudder mechanism might have caused the aircraft"s crash. Though considered to be a "mechanic's oversight", the CAB nevertheless wired all operators of 707s to inform them of the potential danger of the assembly.

In January 1963, the CAB released its aircraft accident report stating that the "most likely abnormality" to have caused the crash was a short circuit caused by wires in the automatic piloting system that had been damaged in the manufacturing process. It stated that the probable cause of the accident was "...rudder control system malfunction producing yaw, sideslip, and roll leading to a loss of control from which recovery was not effective" and concluded "that a rudder servo malfunction due to shorted wires is the most likely abnormality to have produced the accident."

CAB inspectors had inspected units at a Bendix Corporation plant in Teterboro, New Jersey, and discovered workers using tweezers to bind up bundles of wires, thereby damaging them. The Bendix Corporation issued denials, stating that the units underwent 61 inspections during manufacturing, in addition to inspections during installation and maintenance work, and insisted that had the insulation on the wires been breached at some point, it would have surely been detected and the unit replaced.

American Airlines continues using the "Flight 1" designator after the accident; AA1 is still used for a daily morning departure from New York-JFK to Los Angeles using an Airbus A321T as of 2022.

Notable victims 
Well-known persons aboard the aircraft when it went down in Jamaica Bay included:

 Admiral Richard Lansing Conolly, USN (retired), president of Long Island University and two-time Deputy Chief of Naval Operations, and his wife Helen
 George T. Felbeck, retired president of Union Carbide and former operations manager of Oak Ridge, Tennessee's uranium enrichment plant, traveling the day after he retired.
 W. Alton Jones, multimillionaire, former president and chairman of Cities Service Company and close personal friend of Dwight D. Eisenhower: Jones was found to be carrying $55,690 in cash, including a rare $10,000 bill.
 Arnold Kirkeby, millionaire realtor and former head of the Kirkeby chain of luxury hotels
 Louise Sara Eastman, mother of Linda McCartney
 Emelyn Whiton, 1952 Olympic sailing gold medalist (6-m keelboat)

In addition to the loss of life, fifteen of painter Arshile Gorky's paintings and drawings were destroyed in the crash.

In popular culture
The crash serves as the central plot element in the 2008 Mad Men episode "Flight 1".

See also 

 Aviation safety
 List of accidents and incidents involving commercial aircraft
 American Airlines Flight 1 (1936)
 American Airlines Flight 1 (1941)

References

External links 
Another picture of the ill-fated 707
A picture of the rudder of the accident aircraft

Airliner accidents and incidents in New York City
Airliner accidents and incidents caused by maintenance errors
Airliner accidents and incidents caused by mechanical failure
Aviation accidents and incidents in the United States in 1962
1
Accidents and incidents involving the Boeing 707
1960s in Queens
1962 in New York City
March 1962 events in the United States